Jack in the Green: Live in Germany 1970–1993 is a video by English rock band Jethro Tull, released in 2008. It comprises in-concert footage recorded in Germany by the band from 1970 to 1993.

DVD track listing 
Rockpop in Concert - 1982
Fallen on Hard Times (Ian Anderson, Dave Pegg)
Pussy Willow (Anderson)
Heavy Horses (Anderson, Pegg)
Jack in the Green (Anderson)
Keyboard solo (Instrumental) (John Evan, Pegg)
Sweet Dream (Anderson)
Aqualung (Anderson)
Locomotive Breath (Anderson)
Cheerio (Anderson)

Rocksummer - 1986
Hunting Girl (Anderson)

Out in the Green - 1986
Thick as a Brick (Anderson)
Black Sunday (Anderson)
Improvisation II (Barre, Anderson)
Too Old to Rock and Roll, Too Young to Die (Anderson)

Live - 1993
My Sunday Feeling (Anderson)
So Much Trouble (Anderson)

Beat-Club 1970 – 1971
With You There to Help Me (Anderson)
Nothing is Easy (Anderson)

Personnel
 Ian Anderson – vocals, flute, guitar (1967-2014)
 Martin Barre – electric guitar (1968-2014)
 John Evan – keyboards (1970–1980)
 Peter Vettese – keyboards, vocoder (1982–1986; studio – 1989)
 Andrew Giddings – keyboards (1991–2007)
 Glenn Cornick – bass guitar (1967–1970; died 2014)
 Dave Pegg – bass guitar (1979–1995)
 Clive Bunker – drums (1967–1971)
 Gerry Conway – drums (1982; studio – 1987–1988)
 Doane Perry – drums (2007-2012)

See also 
 Living with the Past
 Live at Madison Square Garden 1978

References

External links 
 Jethro Tull - Jack in the Green: Live in Germany 1970–1993 (2008) DVD Official Page at www.JethroTull.com [Dead Link]
 Jethro Tull - Jack in the Green: Live in Germany 1970–1993 (2008) DVD releases & credits at Discogs.com
 Jethro Tull - Jack in the Green: Live in Germany 1970–1993 (2008) DVD review by Greg Prato, credits & releases at AllMusic.com
 Jethro Tull - Jack in the Green: Live in Germany 1970–1993 (2008) DVD credits & user reviews at ProgArchives.com

Jethro Tull (band) video albums
Progressive rock video albums
Live video albums
Jethro Tull (band) live albums
2008 video albums
2008 live albums